Events from the year 1923 in Canada.

Incumbents

Crown 
 Monarch – George V

Federal government 
 Governor General – Julian Byng 
 Prime Minister – William Lyon Mackenzie King
 Chief Justice – Louis Henry Davies (Prince Edward Island) 
 Parliament – 14th

Provincial governments

Lieutenant governors 
Lieutenant Governor of Alberta – Robert Brett 
Lieutenant Governor of British Columbia – Walter Cameron Nichol  
Lieutenant Governor of Manitoba – James Albert Manning Aikins    
Lieutenant Governor of New Brunswick – William Pugsley (until February 28) then William Frederick Todd 
Lieutenant Governor of Nova Scotia – MacCallum Grant   
Lieutenant Governor of Ontario – Henry Cockshutt
Lieutenant Governor of Prince Edward Island – Murdock MacKinnon 
Lieutenant Governor of Quebec – Charles Fitzpatrick (until October 31) then Louis-Philippe Brodeur 
Lieutenant Governor of Saskatchewan – Henry William Newlands

Premiers 
Premier of Alberta – Herbert Greenfield  
Premier of British Columbia – John Oliver  
Premier of Manitoba – John Bracken 
Premier of New Brunswick – Walter Foster (until February 28) then Peter Veniot 
Premier of Nova Scotia – George Henry Murray (until January 24) then Ernest Howard Armstrong 
Premier of Ontario – Ernest Drury (until July 16) then George Howard Ferguson  
Premier of Prince Edward Island – John Howatt Bell (until September 5) then James D. Stewart
Premier of Quebec – Louis-Alexandre Taschereau 
Premier of Saskatchewan – Charles Avery Dunning

Territorial governments

Commissioners 
 Gold Commissioner of Yukon – George P. MacKenzie 
 Commissioner of Northwest Territories – William Wallace Cory

Events
January 1 – The Department of National Defence comes into being
January 24 – Ernest Armstrong becomes premier of Nova Scotia, replacing George Henry Murray, who had governed for 27 years
February 28 – Peter Veniot becomes premier of New Brunswick, replacing Walter Foster
April 23 – Marijuana is prohibited soon after the House of Commons passes a bill on this date that includes making marijuana illegal
March 2 – The Halibut Treaty signed with the United States is Canada's first international treaty not signed under the auspices of the United Kingdom
June 25 – Ontario election: Howard Ferguson's Conservatives win a majority, defeating Ernest Drury's United Farmers of Ontario
July 1 – The Chinese Immigration Act, 1923 comes into effect, banning all Chinese from entering Canada except for businessmen, diplomats, foreign students, and "special circumstances"
July 16 – Howard Ferguson becomes premier of Ontario, replacing Ernest Drury
August 18 – The Home Bank of Canada fails
September 5 – James D. Stewart becomes premier of Prince Edward Island, replacing J.H. Bell
October 8 – A stevedore's strike begins in Vancouver
October 10 – Canadian National Railway is formed by merger of Canadian Government Railways, Canadian Northern Railway, Grand Trunk Pacific Railway, and Grand Trunk Railway
October 25 – Frederick Banting and Charles Best win the Nobel Prize for Medicine for the discovery of insulin
October 31 – Louis-Philippe Brodeur becomes Quebec's 13th Lieutenant Governor

Full date unknown
The Duplex, a Canadian 4-cylinder automobile is built in Montreal.
Fleetwood-Knight, a Canadian automobile is built in Kingston, Ontario.

Arts and literature

Music
April 23 – The Toronto Symphony Orchestra gives its first concert.

New books
 Rilla of Ingleside Lucy Maud Montgomery (1921)

Sport
March 14 – World's first complete play-by-play radio broadcast of a professional ice hockey game is done by Pete Parker in Regina.
March 22 – Foster Hewitt announces his first ice hockey game. 
March 22 & 26 – The Manitoba Junior Hockey League's University of Manitoba win their only Memorial Cup by defeating the Ontario Hockey Association's Kitchener Colts 14 to 6 in a two-game aggregate played Arena Gardens in Toronto 
March 31 – Ottawa Senators win their 10th Stanley Cup by defeating the Western Canada Hockey League's Edmonton Eskimos 2 games to 0. The deciding game was played at Vancouver's Denman Arena
December 1 – Queen's University win their second Grey Cup by defeating the Regina Rugby Club 54–0 in the 11th Grey Cup played at Varsity Stadium in Toronto

Births

January to March
January 1 – Roméo Sabourin, World War II spy (d. 1944)
January 7 – Hugh Kenner, literary scholar, critic and professor (d. 2003)
January 21 – Judith Merril, science fiction writer, editor and political activist (d. 1997)
January 27 – Marcelle Corneille, administrator and educator (d. 2019)
February 4 – Conrad Bain, actor (Maude, Diff'rent Strokes) (d. 2013)
March 1 – Uno Helava, inventor
March 2 – Ghitta Caiserman-Roth, painter (d. 2005)
March 4 – Stanley Haidasz, politician (d. 2009)
March 10 – Richard Doyle, journalist, editor and Senator (d. 2003)
March 15 – Laurent Desjardins, politician (d. 2012)
March 19 – Henry Morgentaler, physician and pro choice advocate (d. 2013)
March 23 - James Barber, cookbook author and television chef (d. 2007)
March 30 – Milton Acorn, poet, writer and playwright (d. 1986)

April to June
April 7 – Aba Bayefsky, artist and teacher (d. 2001)
April 16 – Samuel Nathan Cohen, critic
April 25 – Melissa Hayden, ballerina (d. 2006)
May 5 – John Black Aird, lawyer, politician and 23rd Lieutenant Governor of Ontario (d. 1995)
May 9 – Reuben Baetz, politician (d. 1996)
May 18 – Jean-Louis Roux, entertainer and playwright
May 20 – Frank Morris, Canadian football player (d. 2009)
June 5 – Roger Lebel, actor (d. 1994)
June 6 – Bruce Campbell, Edmonton alderman (d. 2011)

July to September
July 21 – Rudolph A. Marcus, chemist and 1992 Nobel Prize in Chemistry laureate
July 25 – Bill Fitsell, sports journalist and historian (d. 2020)
July 31 – Victor Goldbloom, pediatrician, lecturer and politician (d. 2016)
August 3 – Robert Campeau, financier and real estate developer
August 6 – Paul Hellyer, politician and commentator
September 1 – Kenneth Thomson, 2nd Baron Thomson of Fleet, businessman and art collector (d. 2006)
September 2 – David Lam, businessman and 25th Lieutenant Governor of British Columbia (d. 2010)
September 7 – Byron Seaman, businessman and part owner of the Calgary Flames (d. 2021)
September 18 – Bertha Wilson, jurist and first female Puisne Justice of the Supreme Court of Canada (d. 2007)
September 21 – Robert Uffen, research geophysicist, professor, and university administrator (d. 2009)

October to December
October 7 – Jean-Paul Riopelle, painter and sculptor (d. 2002)
October 10 - Kildare Dobbs, short story and travel writer (d. 2013)
October 22 – Rodrigue Bourdages, politician (d. 1997)
October 22 – Norman Levine, short-story writer, novelist and poet (d. 2005)
October 23 – Réjane L. Colas, jurist
November 1 – Gordon R. Dickson, science fiction author (d. 2001)
November 2 – Harold Horwood, novelist and non-fiction writer (d. 2006)
November 11 – Donald Tolmie, politician (d. 2009)
November 22 – Arthur Hiller, film director
December 27 – Bruno Bobak, artist (d. 2012)

Deaths

January to June
February 20 – Thomas George Roddick, surgeon, medical administrator and politician (b. 1846)
March 2 – Joseph Martin, lawyer, politician and 13th Premier of British Columbia (b. 1852)
April 25 – Louis-Olivier Taillon, Premier of Quebec (b. 1840)
June 7 – John Best, politician (b. 1861)

July to December
July 17 – John Strathearn Hendrie, Lieutenant Governor of Ontario (b. 1857)
October 2 – John Wilson Bengough, political cartoonist (b. 1851)
December 5 – William Mackenzie, railway contractor and entrepreneur (b. 1849)
December 9 – John Herbert Turner, Premier of British Columbia (b. 1834)

See also
 List of Canadian films

Historical documents
"Surely our nation is not to be wiped out" - Cree storyteller Chief Thunderchild (Piyesiw-Awasis) seeks way on "a long and difficult journey"

Former cabinet minister on Canada's interest in and best approach to problems in Europe

PM King defends Chinese Immigration Act provisions to abolish head tax and admit merchants and students (Note: anti-Asian comments)

Fuel advisor says reduce homeowners' need for U.S. coal by promoting other fuels (peat, coke, lignite) and furnace efficiency

Saskatchewan premier wants solution to grain marketing issue that's free of politics and divisiveness

Saskatchewan employers seek cuts in pink collar workers' wages

Minister of Health's Narcotic Drugs Act amendment makes "a new drug" (cannabis) illegal

Local Simcoe, Ont. manufacturer donates land for future county hospital

Map: Vancouver and suburbs electric railway network

"The people of (British Columbia) have not, as a whole, concerned themselves much with its past" - British Columbia Historical Association to change that

Profile of Beautiful Joe author Margaret Marshall Saunders' menagerie

References

 
Years of the 20th century in Canada
Canada
Canada